Alan Fyffe (30 April 1884 – 5 March 1939) was a British athlete. He competed in the men's hammer throw at the 1908 Summer Olympics. He also played thirteen first-class cricket matches for Oxford University Cricket Club between 1906 and 1925.

See also
 List of Oxford University Cricket Club players

References

1884 births
1939 deaths
Athletes (track and field) at the 1908 Summer Olympics
British male hammer throwers
Olympic athletes of Great Britain
English cricketers
Oxford University cricketers
Free Foresters cricketers
Cheshire cricketers
Harlequins cricketers
H. D. G. Leveson Gower's XI cricketers